The Codex is a thriller novel by Douglas Preston and takes place in the Southwestern United States and Central America. The book was published on December 8, 2003, by Tor Books.

Plot
Maxwell Broadbent, an eccentric rich man with terminal cancer, has spent his entire life collecting valuable art and treasures from around the world. One day, he writes a letter to his three sons telling them to go to his New Mexico house. Upon their arrival, they find Maxwell and all of the valuables missing, with only a cryptic message left behind hinting at his location. The message explains that his final test for them is to find his tomb, promising that the son that finds his tomb will receive all his treasures—worth approximately $300 million. The three sons—Philip the eldest, Vernon the middle son, and Tom the youngest—each go their separate ways after figuring out that their father is somewhere in Central America. Philip recruits Marcus Hauser, a private investigator who briefly served as his father's partner in their earliest treasure hunting endeavors, and Hauser subsequently hires a group of Central American mercenaries to aid and protect them. Vernon approaches the greedy leader of his San Francisco-based cult, and the two of them find three Central American guides.

Tom is the only one who is not interested in the treasure at all, until he is approached by a beautiful ethnopharmacologist named Sally Colorado, who informs Tom that his father tried to present an ancient Mayan Codex to a museum for translation years back, only to be rejected since no one knew ancient Mayan at the time. Years later, after ancient Mayan has been deciphered, Sally and her fiancé, Yale professor Julian Clyve, have deduced from a single surviving photograph that the Codex may contain many ancient Mayan herbal remedies that, if studied and reproduced in present times, could revolutionize medicine and cure many diseases. Tom reluctantly agrees to help her, and they eventually recruit a witty tribal elder named Don Alfonso, accompanied by the brother trackers Pingo and Chori.

However, Hauser has also discovered the existence of the Codex, and decides to find it specifically so that he can sell it to Lewis Skiba, the CEO of the failing company Lampe-Denison Pharmaceuticals. Similarly, Professor Clyve also plans to sell the Codex to a Swiss pharmaceutical company as well, having lied to his fiancé.

Over the course of the novel, the brothers' paths eventually cross nearly simultaneously in Honduras, after Vernon's teacher and three guides have all died from disease. Philip escapes from Hauser and his men after discovering their secret brutal nature (including an attempt, through bribery, to have the corrupt military kill Tom and Sally), and is found by his brothers nearly dead. Later, Hauser's men kill Pingo and Chori, and Don Alfonso himself succumbs to wounds sustained in a firefight. The three brothers and Sally are all nearly dead when they are rescued and nursed back to health by a lonely native named Borabay, who is revealed to be the true eldest son of Maxwell Broadbent, and the fourth brother, having been conceived when Maxwell had an affair with a native woman. Borabay leads them to a village inhabited by the Tara tribe. The Tara chief recalls how, decades earlier, Maxwell Broadbent had raided a large, mountaintop temple known as the White City (accessible only by a single rope bridge), and taking all of the treasure back to America with him. The chief reveals that after Maxwell returned to Honduras with the treasure, he requested to be buried with his treasure in the very White City that he raided. However, at his early funeral, the chief tricked him; instead of giving him poison to kill him, he gave him a drink that rendered him unconscious long enough for the treasure to be buried with him, before he eventually awoke inside the tomb. Thus, the Broadbents now have to recover the treasure and save their father.

Hauser and his men have already converged on the White City and begin dynamiting the area to find the right tomb. The Broadbents manage to find the right tomb, with a barely-alive Maxwell still inside. Hauser attacks them and fatally shoots Maxwell, but the five of them manage to escape to the rope bridge before being blocked in on both sides by Hauser's men. As Hauser himself approaches to kill them, Tom holds up a canteen full of gasoline and reveals that Sally is on a ridge hundreds of yards away with a sniper rifle, prepared to shoot the canteen and blow up the bridge. Hauser calls their bluff, but when he attempts to throw the canteen over the bridge, Sally successfully shoots it, setting Hauser on fire and eventually causing him to plummet to his death. The Broadbents all make it back across the bridge while the soldiers panic, with Sally and the Broadbent brothers killing half of the soldiers while the other half is trapped in the White City after the bridge breaks. All the surviving soldiers eventually starve to death.

Back in the Tara village, Maxwell is tended to as he dies of his injury, admitting that he would've died of the cancer even if he had survived the attack. He spends his final days reconciling with his sons, who all forgive him in return. He then agrees to the deal and splits the treasure between the sons, with each receiving roughly $100 million. Borabay is the one dissenter who does not wish to receive any of the treasure, instead simply asking for American citizenship and Maxwell's New Mexico estate to live in. Maxwell happily obliges his request, and then dies in peace. He is given a proper funeral by the Tara people, who have finally forgiven him.

In the epilogue, Lewis Skiba's company has gone bankrupt since the Codex was never brought to him, but Skiba finds himself strangely at peace since he was aware of Hauser's brutal methods, and is glad that Hauser failed. Similarly, Sally finds out about Clyve's deception, as Clyve is now being sued by the Swiss pharmaceutical company, claiming that he scammed them. The Codex, which was eventually found among the treasure, is studied by Sally and eventually published openly to the world, bringing in a new era of medicine and revolutionizing several disease treatments. Tom and Sally have fallen in love, and are eventually married. Tom starts his own veterinarian business, while Borabay begins enjoying the privileges of living in America.

External links
Book profile on www.fantasticfiction.co.uk
www.bookcrossing.com

American thriller novels
2004 American novels
Techno-thriller novels
Novels by Douglas Preston
Tor Books books